Ministry of Love is the debut studio album by American indie rock band Io Echo. It was released in April 2013 under Iamsound Records.

Track listing

References

External links
Ministry of Love by Io Echo at iTunes.com

2013 albums
Iamsound Records albums